Patras Lighthouse is a lighthouse and landmark of the Greek city of Patras. It is situated on the seafront (at the beginning of Trion Navarchon street), opposite the temple of Saint Andrew.

History 
The first wooden lighthouse of Patras was built in the dock of Agios Nikolaos in 1858 and was destroyed by a storm in 1865. The old stone lighthouse was built  in 1878. It covered a surface of 4-5 square meters, while its height was 17 meters. It was demolished in 1972 in the period of the military junta during the port's modernization.

In 1999 the coastal zone council decided to rebuild the lighthouse in a southern location near Saint Andrew's cathedral. The reconstructed Patras lighthouse does not have a maritime usage but is one of the city's symbols and main sights. In the ground level there is a café – bar – restaurant, while in the surrounding area there is a seaside park, as well as free parking space.

Gallery

See also 

 List of lighthouses in Greece
 Saint Andrew of Patras
 Archaeological Museum of Patras

References

External links 
 
 Patras lighthouse

Lighthouses in Greece
Buildings and structures in Patras
Tourist attractions in Patras
Transport in Patras